Otoyol routes in Turkey follow a regional based two-digit numbering system. All routes have the prefix O on all signage and maps. Motorways that start in the Marmara Region are all single digit. Motorways that start in The Central Anatolia Region have a first digit of two. Motorways starting in the Aegean Region have a first digit of three. Motorways starting in the Mediterranean Region and Southeastern Anatolia Region have a first digit of five. The O-21A is the only motorway to have a letter assigned to it. Most motorways in Turkey have six lanes (3+3 lanes), however there are sections of some motorways with only four (2+2) lanes. The motorways extended to 27 of the country's 81 provincial-level administrative divisions.

List of Otoyol routes

Projects

Under Construction

Tender Phase

Planning Phase

See also
List of motorway tunnels in Turkey
List of highways in Turkey
Transport in Turkey

External links
 Official Motorway maps

References

Turkey
Highways
Turkey transport-related lists